Água Santa (Holy Water) is a municipality in the state of Rio Grande do Sul, Brazil.

References

External links
FAMURS General information about the town (in Portuguese).

Municipalities in Rio Grande do Sul